Interception may refer to:

Interception, in sport, the catching of a pass by a player on an opposing team
Interception (water), the interception of precipitation by vegetation
Military Signals intelligence
Telephone tapping, the interception of a phone call
Lawful interception, telephone tapping by authorities
Tax refund interception, the forcible use of a tax refund to pay an outstanding obligation
Interception is a medical term for post-coital contraception

See also 
 Intercept (disambiguation)
 Interceptor (disambiguation)